The Miss Exotic World Pageant (officially, the Miss Exotic World Pageant and Striptease Reunion) is an annual neo-burlesque pageant and convention, and is the annual showcase event (and fundraiser for) the Burlesque Hall of Fame (formerly the Exotic World burlesque museum).  The pageant, sometimes referred to as the "Miss America of Burlesque",  attracts former burlesque queens from past decades, as well as current participants of the neo-burlesque scene. The pageant consists of burlesque performances spanning a weekend, culminating with the competition to crown a single performer as Miss Exotic World. Because of the significance of the Exotic World Burlesque Museum to the burlesque community, winning the pageant is considered a top honor for a burlesque performer.

Artists such as Josh Ellingson, Mister Reusch and Mitch O’Connell have designed posters for the event.

History

1990 to 2004 
The pageant grew out an annual event held by Jennie Lee (dancer) and the Exotic Dancers' League (EDL), first held in 1958 and then annually through 1989. Awards were given out starting in 1962 to performers and promoters who furthered burlesque and showed it in a positive light. After Lee's death in 1990, the pageant was created and took place at the Exotic World Museum's grounds in Helendale, California from 1991 through 2005 before relocating to Las Vegas.
Exotic World Museum curator Dixie Evans initiated the Miss Exotic World pageant in 1990 as a way to draw people to the museum. She garnered attention by sending out a press release claiming that "Lili St. Cyr, Tempest Storm, Blaze Starr and 30 other alumni of burlesque will all be invited to attend this reunion." While technically true, none of those invitees attended that year. However, the release garnered press attention for the pageant, which was successful enough to become an annual event, held on the first Saturday in June each year, close to the traditional time of year of the EDL's previous annual events.

1996's Rio Savant was the first black winner of the pageant, and would remain the only black winner for 20 years.

2005 
In 2005, the pageant significantly expanded to mark its 15th year, as well as to accelerate the museum's fundraising efforts. Where originally the pageant had been a one-day event, it grew and was expanded to last a weekend after its first decade. The new format featured an entire evening dedicated to the "legends" – the mostly sexagenarian and septuagenarian women of burlesque's "golden age" of the 1950s and 1960s. Other new changes to the pageant included the expansion of financial sponsors; a glossy souvenir program; a celebrity master of ceremonies (El Vez); expanded seating (and shade areas); and a professional entertainment stage with sound and lighting as an improvement upon the aging wooden stage that had been used in previous years.

Some of the most significant changes by 2005 were changes to the pageant application and judging process; changes that had been initiated in 2001. The pageant had expanded from having only one "Miss Exotic World" category to now include other new categories such as Best Debut. Additionally, the application process was tightened up, with the evaluation method standardized to further ensure professionalism and fairness.

2006 to present 
In 2006, the pageant took place in a new location, Las Vegas, in the wake of certain events that greatly affected the museum's operational ability. (Specifically, the state of disrepair of the property, and the death of property owner Charles Arroyo.) With the museum's impending move to Las Vegas, the pageant was held there, based at the Celebrity Theater in downtown Las Vegas. The pageant, up to that point held on the first Saturday in June, was instead held over Memorial Day weekend in late May, 2006. The pageant consisted of four evenings' worth of events and featured dual hosts Margaret Cho and El Vez. Since 2006, the pageant has made Las Vegas its permanent home. In 2016, Poison Ivory became the second black winner in the pageant's history, 20 years after Rio Savant.

Miss Exotic World winners

References

External links

Behind the Burly Q. 2010 documentary film by Leslie Zemeckis
Exotic World & the Burlesque Revival. 2010 documentary film by Red Tremmel

Burlesque
Exotic
Recurring events established in 1990
1990 establishments in the United States
American awards